Gerard Heath Lander (sometimes Gerald; sometimes Heath-Lander; 14 August 186114 November 1934) was an Anglican bishop.

He was born on 14 August 1861 and educated at Trinity College, Cambridge. He was made deacon in Advent 1884 (21 December), by J. C. Ryle, Bishop of Liverpool, at St Peter's Pro-Cathedral, Liverpool; and ordained priest in 1885; and initially served as a Curate at St Bride, Liverpool. He then held incumbencies at St Benedict, Everton; St Philip, Litherland; and St Cyprian, Liverpool before being appointed to the episcopate in 1907 as the fifth Bishop of Victoria, a post he held for 13 years. He was consecrated a bishop on St Peter's Day 1907 (29 June), by Randall Davidson, Archbishop of Canterbury, at Lambeth Parish Church. By May 1920, he had "signified his intention of resigning his see [that] year"; he must have done so before his successor's consecration on 24 June. On his return to England he was Vicar of Holy Trinity, New Barnet (until 1933); Archdeacon of Bedford (1933 onwards); and an Assistant Bishop of St Albans (1924 onwards). He died on 14 November 1934, collapsing suddenly at King's Cross Station.

References

1861 births
1934 deaths
Alumni of Trinity College, Cambridge
Anglican bishops of Victoria, Hong Kong
20th-century Anglican bishops in China
Principals of St. Paul's College, Hong Kong
Archdeacons of Bedford